Pettini is a surname. Notable people with the surname include: 

 Joe Pettini (born 1955), American baseball player and coach
 Mark Pettini (born 1983), English cricketer
 Max Pettini (born 1949), British astronomer